The 1999–2000 season was the 99th season in Athletic Bilbao's history and their 69th consecutive season in La Liga, the top division of Spanish football.

Season summary

1999–2000, the fourth season of Luis Fernández's tenure as head coach, was his least successful so far in terms of both league and cup results. It was the first La Liga campaign of the Frenchman's reign in which Athletic finished outside the top ten, placing 11th. They also suffered an early exit from the Copa del Rey, losing in the second round to Rayo Vallecano.

Fernández left his post at the end of the season, and Real Zaragoza's Txetxu Rojo was appointed in his place. Rojo had had two previous spells at San Mamés – as a successful forward between 1965 and 1982, and as head coach in the latter part of the 1989–90 season.

Squad statistics

Appearances and goals

|}

Results

La Liga

League table

See also
1999–2000 La Liga
1999–2000 Copa del Rey

External links

References

Athletic Bilbao
Athletic Bilbao seasons